Team 5 is a 2017 Indian Malayalam-language film directed by Suresh Govind. The film stars cricketer S. Sreesanth and Nikki Galrani in the lead roles. The film was dubbed in Tamil and Telugu.

Plot
Akhil who is the back bone of his gang participates in racing tournaments all around the city along with his gang mates. Akhil's life takes a dramatic turn when he falls in love with an event manager Irene.

Cast 
S. Sreesanth as Akhil
Nikki Galrani as Nancy
Sumesh Krishnan
Pearle Maaney as Aleena
Makarand Deshpande
Anand Bhairav as Sachu

Production 
Former cricketer, S. Sreesanth, signed the film to play the lead role as a bike racer. The film was shot in Australia, Bangalore, and Goa. Sreesanth learned several bike stunts for his role in the film. Niiki Galrani was signed to portray the lead actress.

Soundtrack 

The songs are composed by Gopi Sundar.

Release
Indiaglitz opined that "This stunt of a movie moves just too low and too fast. ‘Team Five’ is a mediocre movie that falls flat too soon". nettv4u said that "The film might impress the viewers, who are interested in watching the racing genre movies. Normal audiences might not like the film. Team 5, the first attempt of Sreesanth didn’t turn out to be the best effort".

References

External links 

2017 films
2010s Malayalam-language films
Motorcycle racing films
Films shot in Bangalore
Films shot in Australia
Films shot in Goa
Indian auto racing films